Odontosciara nigra is a species of dark-winged fungus gnats in the family Sciaridae.

References

Further reading

 

Sciaridae
Articles created by Qbugbot
Insects described in 1821